Romildo is a given name. Notable people with the name include:

 Romildo Etcheverry (1906–1967), Paraguayan footballer
 Romildo Ribeiro Soares (born 1947), Brazilian televangelist and missionary
 Romildo (footballer, born 1973), Romildo Santos Rosa, Brazilian football defender
 Romildo (footballer, born 2000), Romildo Del Piage de Souza, Brazilian football midfielder

Other uses
 Romildo, a Thoroughbred racehorse, winner of the 1984 Prix Ganay